Ayodele Patrick Aderinwale MFR is the Executive Director of the Africa Leadership Forum in Ota, Nigeria.

Education
Aderinwale was born in Osogbo, Nigeria. He attended the University of Lagos for his first degree in Political Science and a Master of Science in Political Economy and International Relations in 1985 and 1987, respectively. He is an alumnus of the United Nations University's International Leadership Academy, and of Harvard University's Executive Programme for Leaders in Development.

Work
He provides consulting services for several international agencies, including the United Nations, European Union and the former Organization of Africa Unity now known as the African Union. He participated in the initial drafting of the Millennium Plan for Africa (MAP) which later became the New Partnership for Africa's Development (NEPAD) and was an inaugural member of the Nigeria Steering Committee of the Africa Peer Review Mechanism (APRM).

He is currently the Chairman of the Board of Directors of Justrite Limited, one of the largest superstores in Lagos and Ogun States; Chairman of the Board of Directors of the Business School Netherlands and Chairman of the Board of Governors of the Bells Educational Services, as well as the Bells Comprehensive Secondary School for Boys and Girls.

Africa Leadership Forum
As the Executive Director of ALF, he began several programs such as the Regional African Parliamentarians Conference, the Africa Women's Forum, the Legislative Internship Programme and the Democratic Leadership Training Workshop. He helped create the Conference on Stability, Security, Development and Cooperation in Africa (CSSDCA) which was adopted by the African Union in 2002.

Presently he is the deputy chief coordinator at the Olusegun Obasanjo Presidential Library while Obansanjo remains the chief coordinator.

National honours
On 21 December 2006, the President of Nigeria, Olusegun Obasanjo, conferred on him the membership of the Order of the Federal Republic. His classmates and colleagues launched a foundation, the Ayodele Aderinwale Foundation for Education and Leadership in Africa (AAFELA) in his honor, which provides scholarships to young boys and girls in schools across the country.

References

External links
Leadership Forum

Harvard University alumni
University of Lagos alumni
Aderinwale, Ayodele
Year of birth missing (living people)
Living people
Yoruba people
Aderinwale, Ayodele
Members of the Order of the Federal Republic
United Nations University alumni